Stephens High School or Saint Stephens High School may refer to:

 Stephens High School (Arkansas), Stephens, Arkansas
 Stephens High School (Georgia), a high school for African Americans in Calhoun, Georgia
 St. Stephens High School, Hickory, North Carolina
 Saint Stephen's High School, Manila, Philippines
 St. Stephen's High School (Bradshaw, Maryland)
 St. Stephen High School,  St. Stephen, New Brunswick

See also
 St. Stephen's School (disambiguation)